The 2018 FIBA 3x3 World Cup was held in Bocaue in the Manila region, Philippines, and was contested by 20 teams.

Participating teams
All five FIBA zones were represented. The top 20 teams, including the hosts, based on the FIBA National Federation ranking qualified for the tournament.

Ecuador was replaced by Indonesia.

Players

Preliminary round

Pool A

Pool B

Pool C

Pool D

Knockout stage

Final standings

Awards

Individual awards
Most Valuable Player
 Dušan Bulut (SRB)
Team of the Tournament 
 Dušan Bulut (SRB)
 Michael Hicks (POL)
 Jesper Jobse (NED)

Individual contests

Dunk contest

Shoot-out contest

References

External links
Official website

Men's
3x3 World Cup